Amazonspinther dalmata is a species of characin endemic to Brazil, where it is found in the Rio Purus and Rio Madeira basins.  It is the only member of its genus. It is recorded to live in freshwater within a tropical climate. Their habitat is benthopelagic. This species reaches up to 2 cm (0.9 in) in standard length. They are found in low-movement waters with a slow current and a muddy, silty, or sandy bottom. They prefer clear waters with submerged vegetation. Black spots occur on the base of its dorsal fin.

References

Characidae
Endemic fauna of Brazil
Freshwater fish of Brazil
Fish of the Amazon basin
Monotypic ray-finned fish genera
Fish described in 2008